This is a list of active and extinct volcanoes in Uganda.

References

Uganda
 
Volcanoes